When I Was King and Other Verses (1905) is a collection of poetry by Australian poet and author Henry Lawson.

The original edition consisted of 76 poems, representing work that Lawson had published in the years since his previous major collection, Verses, Popular and Humorous was published in 1900.  The book's publisher, Angus and Robertson, also released the collection in two volumes later the same year, titled The Elder Son and When I Was King.  These volumes were released under the publisher's Commonwealth Series of poetry collections and contain roughly half the original contents each.

Contents

Critical reception

A reviewer in The Queenslander noted similarities between this book and a recent volume of poems by Louisa Lawson, the mother of Henry, although there was also something extra to be found in the current book: "Only a few weeks ago the poems of Henry Lawson's mother were noticed in these columns, and though in them there was more gentleness, better taste, more refinement than are found in the verses of the son, yet there is a similarity, if only in the very human tone pervading them and the strong Australian atmosphere. Henry Lawson has long since earned the right to be heard in both prose and verse; indeed, he is familiar to readers as are many of the verses in this new volume of his; but yet in one way we find a new Lawson, a man who has evidently upon him the spirit of repentance for something done, and a strong desire to make amends. So strong are these evidences, and so directly put, that it is impossible to dissociate them from a personal application."

A reviewer in The Age was less than impressed: "It is to be feared that even the most ardent of Mr. Lawson's admirers will look upon this book of verse as a disappointment. It represents the results of bis five years' work since he returned from England in 1900 — years that for various reasons must be considered the blackest of his life — and the unevenness of that work is almost painful to contemplate now that we have it in bulk. Only occasionally does he display any gleam — and then only a fleeting one — which bears any promise of better things in the future."

External links
 Full text of the collection at Setis.

See also

 1905 in Australian literature
 1905 in poetry

References

Poetry by Henry Lawson
Australian poetry collections
1905 books
Angus & Robertson books